Karor Lal Esan (Saraiki, Punjabi) is a city of Layyah District in the Punjab province of Pakistan. The city is the capital of Karor Lal Esan Tehsil and administrative subdivision of the district.

History

Etymology 
Its old name is Depal Pur. The city is partially named after a saint, Lal Esan  who, it is believed, recited 10 million times the Surah Muzammil (a chapter from the Quran) while standing inside the Indus River. In Urdu 10 million is equal to 1 karor, which is why the city is called Karor Lal Esan.  Lal Esan (original name: Sheikh Yousuf) was the grandfather of Bahauddin Zakariya  Multani.

Heritage

Notable saints around Karor 
There are a few other tombs of saints in the city, e.g. Darbar Baba Ramzan (near Kalma Chowk Karor), Darbar Araf Shah, Darbar Shah Habib sb. and Darbar Shah Ashraf Sb. While there are some out off city but under authority of the city like Khawja Ghulam Hassan Sewag Shareef's tomb is near Karor Lal Esan, at (Hassan abad) Pir Sewag shareef. And Darbar Rajan Shah, at Rajan Shah which is few kilometers away from main city, Rajan Shah has its own small railway station.
There is also Khawaja garrah Jan Muhammad darbar

Festivals
There is a festival called Mela Chodhwein, held in Karor every year in September. It is celebrated in the memory of Lal Esan. The fair showcases events such as horse racing, tent pegging, camel fighting, bullfighting and racing, wrestling, kabaddi, and dodda.

Geography 
It is located at 31°13'0N 70°57'0E with an altitude of 148 metres (488 feet). This city is located on the west coast of the Indus River. The city is located to East of Indus River and Suleman Mountainous ranges, hence the lands in vicinity of river are much fertile growing especially wheat and rice. The area has great potential for natural resources and have a great potential for oil and gas exploration as well defined geological structures (anticlines) have been mapped during the seismic surveys in different areas of Karor that can be potential reservoirs of oil and gas.

Climate 
Karor Lal Esan has extreme weather (as does the whole district of Layyah).  Summer lasts from May to September; June is the hottest month with an average monthly temperature of 50 °C with a maximum of up to 53 °C. In winter, however, the December and January temperatures are as low as 0 to 2 °C average monthly.

Floods 
In 2010, village area of Karor flooded with Indus river. Houses and crops were destroyed. After that people finally took matters into their own hands and rebuilt their homes on raised dirt platforms five to six feet high.

See also
Ashu Lal Faqeer Famous Sairiki language poet from Karor Lal Esan

References

Populated places in Layyah District